Dwight Keith "D. J." Burns Jr. (born October 13, 2000) is an American college basketball player for the NC State Wolfpack of the Atlantic Coast Conference (ACC). He previously played for the Winthrop Eagles of the Big South Conference.

Early life and high school career
Burns grew up in Rock Hill, South Carolina and attended Clover Intermediate School, standing 6'7 in eighth grade. He enrolled at York Preparatory Academy. As a freshman, Burns averaged 13 points and 11 rebounds per game. He averaged 14.2 points, 8.1 rebounds, 3.2 assists and 3.1 blocks per game as a sophomore. As a junior, Burns averaged 14.2 points and 10.3 rebounds per game, earning MVP honors of the C. Dan Joyner Poinsettia Classic and the USA National Prep Championship. He reclassified from the Class of 2019 to the Class of 2018. In three seasons, Burns recorded over 1,000 career points and over 1,000 rebounds. A top 100 recruit, Burns committed to playing college basketball for Tennessee in June 2018, choosing the Volunteers over offers from South Carolina and Virginia.

College career
Burns redshirted his freshman season at Tennessee and lost weight. Following the season, he transferred to Winthrop and received a waiver for immediate eligibility. Burns was named Big South Freshman of the Year. He averaged 11.9 points and 4.1 rebounds per game. As a sophomore, Burns averaged 10.1 points and 3.4 rebounds per game, earning Honorable Mention All-Big South honors. He declared for the 2021 NBA draft, but ultimately returned to Winthrop. In his junior season debut, he scored a career-high 30 points in a 110–78 win against Mary Baldwin University. As a junior, Burns was named Big South Player of the Year.

In May 2022, Burns announced he would play for  NC State in the Atlantic Coast Conference for the 2022-2023 season.

Career statistics

College

|-
| style="text-align:left;"| 2018–19
| style="text-align:left;"| Tennessee
| style="text-align:center;" colspan=11|  Redshirt
|-
| style="text-align:left;"| 2019–20
| style="text-align:left;"| Winthrop
| 33 || 16 || 17.5 || .583 || .000 || .571 || 4.1 || 1.2 || .5 || .7 || 11.9
|-
| style="text-align:left;"| 2020–21
| style="text-align:left;"| Winthrop
| 25 || 24 || 15.7 || .582 || .000 || .610 || 3.4 || .6 || .6 || .5 || 10.1
|- class=sortbottom
| style="text-align:center;" colspan=2| Career
| 58 || 40 || 16.7 || .583 || .000 || .585 || 3.8 || .9 || .6 || .6 || 11.2

Personal life
Burns's father, Dwight Sr., is the agent in charge of York County for South Carolina Probation, Parole and Pardon Services. His mother, Takela, is an assistant principal at Dutchman Creek Middle School. Burns has a younger sister, Nadia. He is a multi-instrumentalist, playing the stand-up bass, tuba, piano and saxophone.

References

External links
Winthrop Eagles bio
Tennessee Volunteers bio

2000 births
Living people
American men's basketball players
Basketball players from South Carolina
Centers (basketball)
NC State Wolfpack men's basketball players
People from Rock Hill, South Carolina
Power forwards (basketball)
Winthrop Eagles men's basketball players